Lisbon Story is a 1946 British musical thriller film directed by Paul L. Stein and starring Patricia Burke, David Farrar, Walter Rilla and Austin Trevor. It was based on the musical The Lisbon Story by Harold Purcell and Harry Parr Davies that ran at The Hippodrome in 1943. The screenplay concerns a cabaret singer and a British intelligence officer who travel to Berlin to rescue an atomic scientist being held there.

Cast
 Patricia Burke as Gabrielle Girard  
 David Farrar as David Warren  
 Walter Rilla as Karl von Schriner  
 Lawrence O'Madden as Michael O'Rourke  
 Austin Trevor as Major Lutzen  
 Paul Bonifas as Stephan Corelle  
 Ralph Truman as Police Commissionaire  
 Joan Seton as Lisette  
 Harry Welchman as George Duncan  
 Martin Walker as Journalist  
 Noele Gordon as Panache  
 Esme Percy as Mariot  
 Allan Jeayes as Dr. Cartier  
 John Ruddock as Pierre Sargon  
 Uriel Porter as Joe
 Richard Tauber made a cameo appearance, singing Pedro the Fisherman and other numbers.

References

External links
 

1946 films
1946 musical films
Films directed by Paul L. Stein
British spy films
1940s spy films
World War II spy films
Films about Nazi Germany
Films set in Berlin
British black-and-white films
British musical films
Films with screenplays by Jack Whittingham
Films shot at British National Studios
1940s English-language films
1940s British films

hu:Lisszaboni történet